Jorge Cândido Alves Rodrigues Telles Grilo Raposo de Abreu de Sena (2 November 1919 – 4 June 1978) was a Portuguese-born poet, critic, essayist, novelist, dramatist, translator and university professor who spent the latter portion of his life in the United States.

Life
Jorge Candido de Sena was the only child of Augusto Raposo de Sena, from Ponta Delgada in the Azores, a merchant marine captain, and Maria da Luz Telles Grilo de Sena, from Covilhã. Both families belonged to the middle class, the mother's originally well-to-do but nothing much remained of it by time her child was born; the father's family hailed from military and political offices, the mother's from merchants. Jorge was born in Lisbon.

He received his degree in civil engineering from the University of Porto, but published his first poems at age 18. His interests were wide-ranging, including literature, intellectual history, politics, and other areas of the cultural spectrum. His liberal yet strongly independent convictions regarding Portuguese politics during the Salazar dictatorship led eventually to his exile in Brazil in 1959, and subsequently, after the military coup in Brazil in 1964, to the United States, in 1965. He became a professor of literature in Brazil, which also afforded him the opportunity to complete his doctorate, and that was his profession in the U.S. until he died.

He died in Santa Barbara, California in 1978. His remains were moved to the Cemitério dos Prazeres in Lisbon on 11 September 2009.

Jorge de Sena is one of the most relevant Portuguese intellectuals of the twentieth century. His output in fiction, drama, essays, and poetry is vast. He considered himself primarily a poet. His autobiographical novel Sinais de Fogo was adapted to film in 1995 by Luís Filipe Rocha, who is also the author of a documentary about Jorge de Sena.

Works

Poetry
 Perseguição (1941)
 Coroa da Terra (1947)
 Pedra Filosofal (1950)
 As Evidências (1955) Evidences
 Fidelidade (1958)
 Metamorfoses (1963)
 Arte de Música (1968)
 Peregrinatio ad Loca Infecta (1969)
 Exorcismos (1972)
 Conheço o Sal e Outros Poemas (1974)
 Poesia I (1977)
 Poesia II (1978)
 Poesia III (1978)
 Visão Perpétua (1982, póstumo)
 Dedicácias (1999, póstumo)

Prose
 Andanças do Demónio (1960)
 Novas Andanças do Demónio (1966)
 Os Grão-Capitães (1976)
 O Físico Prodigioso (1977) The Prodigious Physician
 Sinais de Fogo (romance) (1979, póstumo) Signs of Fire
 Génesis (1983, póstumo)

Drama
 O Indesejado (1951)
 Ulisseia Adúltera (1952)
 O Banquete de Dionísos (1969)
 Epimeteu ou o Homem Que Pensava Depois (1971)

Essays
 Da Poesia Portuguesa (1959)
 O Poeta é um Fingidor (1961)
 O Reino da Estupidez (1961)
 Uma Canção de Camões (1966)
 Os Sonetos de Camões e o Soneto Quinhentista Peninsular  (1969)
 A Estrutura de Os Lusíadas e Outros Estudos Camonianos e de Poesia Peninsular do Século XVI (1970)
 Maquiavel e Outros Estudos (1973)
 Dialécticas Aplicadas da Literatura (1978)
 Fernando Pessoa & Cia. Heterónima (1982, póstumo)

Awards
 Prémio Internacional de Poesia Etna-Taormina
 Ordem do Infante D. Henrique
 Grã-Cruz da Ordem de Sant'Iago da Espada, posthumous 
 In 1980, the Jorge de Sena Center for Portuguese Studies was opened at the University of California, Santa Barbara

References

1919 births
1978 deaths
People from Lisbon
Portuguese poets
Male poets
Portuguese male writers
Portuguese translators
20th-century translators
20th-century poets
20th-century Portuguese writers
University of Porto alumni
20th-century male writers

Portuguese people of Greek descent